Suai Rural LLG (also known as Suwai Rural LLG) is a local-level government (LLG) of Chimbu Province, Papua New Guinea.

Wards
01. Dugul
02. Oglew/Aula
03. Bomaiku
04. Du 1
05. Du 2
06. Du 3
07. Kreku/Sipaku
08. Aniku
09. Kreku/Korul
10. Niniku
11. Piga
12. Kagle
13. Digakane
14. Kumankane
15. Au/Erakane
16. Kagul
17. Yoruaku
18. Mau/Emre
19. Kuiam
20. Maribebi-Kui
21. Kebil 1
22. Kebil2
23. Kebai (Blue Mountain)

References

Local-level governments of Chimbu Province